Donald MacBeth Kennedy (August 21, 1884 – September 25, 1957) was a Canadian farmer as well as a provincial and federal level Canadian politician representing Albertans. He was a UFA MLA 1921-1922 and a Progressive/UFA MP 1921–1935.

Kennedy ran for the United Farmers of Alberta in the 1921 Alberta general election. He defeated Liberal incumbent William Rae in a landslide. Kennedy resigned his seat to provide a seat for Herbert Greenfield who had been named premier of the United Farmers government. Kennedy ran for a seat in the House of Commons of Canada in the 1921 Canadian federal election held months later in the federal electoral district of Edmonton West as a candidate for the Progressive Party of Canada; he defeated former Liberal Member of Parliament Frank Oliver and former Conservative MLA Robert Campbell to win his first term in office.

Kennedy switched to the new Peace River district in the 1925 Canadian federal election. He ran against William Rae, whom he had previously defeated, and Conservative candidate James Arthur Collins. The race ended in a near three-way tie with Kennedy coming out on top; the spread between first and third was 42 votes.

A year later he ran again in the 1926 Canadian federal election this time under the United Farmers of Alberta banner. He defeated Mayor of Edmonton Joseph Clarke and James Arthur Collins again by a much larger margin than the election a year ago.

Kennedy ran for a fourth term in the House of Commons in the 1930 Canadian federal election. He defeated Liberal candidate John Ewing Thompson by a comfortable margin. He was defeated in his bid for a fifth term in office in 1935, this time running under the Co-operative Commonwealth banner, finishing third among four candidates to Social Credit Party of Canada candidate René-Antoine Pelletier.

In parliament, Kennedy joined the Ginger Group of radical MPs in the 1920s.

References

External links
 
 Legislative Assembly of Alberta Members Listing

1884 births
1957 deaths
United Farmers of Alberta MLAs
Members of the House of Commons of Canada from Alberta
Progressive Party of Canada MPs
Ginger Group MPs
Co-operative Commonwealth Federation MPs
United Farmers of Alberta MPs